Papiliocoelotes is a genus of spiders in the family Agelenidae. It was first described in 2016 by Zhao & Li. , it contains five species, all from China.

References

Agelenidae
Araneomorphae genera
Spiders of China